Events from the year 1935 in Japan.

Incumbents
Emperor: Hirohito
Prime Minister: Keisuke Okada

Governors
Aichi Prefecture: Eitaro Shinohara
Akita Prefecture: Takabe Rokuzo 
Aomori Prefecture: Mitsumasa Kobayashi
Ehime Prefecture: Jiro Ichinohe (until 15 January); Jiro Kan Oba (starting 15 January)
Fukui Prefecture: Shinsuke Kondo
Fukushima Prefecture: Ito Takehiko
Gifu Prefecture: 
 until 15 January: Umekichi Miyawaki 
 15 January-31 May: Chi Sakamato
 starting 31 May: Chiaki Saka
Gunma Prefecture: Masao Kanazawa (until 15 January); Seikichi Kimishima (starting 15 June)
Hiroshima Prefecture: Michio Yuzawa (until 15 January); Keiichi Suzuki (starting 15 January)
Ibaraki Prefecture: Abe Kashichi (until 15 January); Ando Kyoushirou (starting 15 January)
Iwate Prefecture: Hidehiko Ishiguro
Kagawa Prefecture: Yoshisuke Kinoshita (until 15 June); Megumi Fujimo (starting 15 June)
Kumamoto Prefecture: Keiichi Suzuki (until 15 January); Sekiya Nobuyuke (starting 15 January)
Kochi Prefecture: Yozora Takehamu (until 16 October); Kobayashi Mitsumasa (starting 16 October)
Kyoto Prefecture: Saito Munenori (until January); Shintaro Suzuki (starting January)
Mie Prefecture: Saburo Hayakawa (until 23 June); Aijiro Tomita (starting 23 June)
Miyagi Prefecture: Kiyoshi Nakarai (until 28 June); Jiro Ino (starting 28 June)
Miyazaki Prefecture: Seikuchi Kimishima (until 15 January); Seiya Mishima (starting 15 January)
Nagano Prefecture: Okoda Shuzo (until 15 January); Seiichi Omora (starting 15 January)
Niigata Prefecture: Chiba Ryo (until 15 June); Miyawaki Umekichi (starting 15 June)
Okinawa Prefecture: Jiro Ino (until 28 June); Hisashi Kurashige (starting 28 June)
Osaka Prefecture: Shinobu Agata (until month unknown)
Saga Prefecture: Shizuo Furukawa
Saitama Prefecture: Kazume Iinuma (until 25 May); Saito Juri (starting 25 May)
Shiname Prefecture: Masaki Fukumura
Tochigi Prefecture: Gunzo Kayaba
Tokyo: Masayasu Kouksaka (until 15 January); Sukenari Yokoya (starting 15 January)
Toyama Prefecture: Saito Itsuki (until 25 May); Ginjiro Toki (starting 25 May)
Yamagata Prefecture: Taro Kanamori

Events
January 8 - Battle of Khalkhyn Temple
February 11 – Tosoh was founded in Tokuyama (now Shunan) Yamaguchi Prefecture, as predecessor name was Toyo Soda.
June - North Chahar Incident
June 27 - Chin-Doihara Agreement
July 5 - establishment of Ōtone Prefectural Natural Park.
August 9 - establishment of Mineokasankei Prefectural Natural Park, Kujūkuri Prefectural Natural Park, Takagoyama Prefectural Natural Park and Yōrō Keikoku Okukiyosumi Prefectural Natural Park.
September 27 - opening of Tōbu-Izumi Station.
October 20 - opening of Musahiro-Tokiwa Station (now Tokiwadai Station (Tokyo)).
Unknown date – Yakult founded in Fukuoka City.
Establishment of Naoki Prize and Akutagawa Prize.

Films
January 20 - Orizuru Osen
November 21 - An Inn in Tokyo
date unknown - Kodakara Sodo

Births
January 4 – Toru Terasawa, runner
January 31 – Kenzaburō Ōe, writer, Nobel Prize laureate (d. 2023)
February 22 – Hisako Kyōda, Japanese voice actress
March 17 – Seiji Yokoyama, musician (d. 2017)
May 15 – Akihiro Miwa, singer, actor, author and drag queen
June 10 – Yoshihiro Tatsumi, Japanese manga artist (d. 2015)
June 26 – Sumiko Shirakawa, voice actress (body discovered. 2015)
June 29 – Katsuya Nomura, baseball player and manager (d. 2020)
July 12 – Satoshi Ōmura, biochemist, Nobel Prize laureate
July 23 – Yukiji Asaoka, singer and actress (d. 2018)
August 24 – Tsutomu Hata, 51st Prime Minister of Japan (d. 2017)
September 14 – Fujio Akatsuka, Japanese cartoonist (d. 2008)
October 2 – Noriko Ohara, actress, voice actress and narrator
October 9 – Teruyoshi Nakano, special effects director
October 10 – Yumiko Kurahashi,  writer (d. 2005)
October 15 – Yukio Ninagawa, theater director (d. 2016)
October 29 – Isao Takahata, film director, screenwriter and producer (d. 2018)
November 15 – Kaneta Kimotsuki, voice actor (d. 2016)
November 28 – Masahito, Prince Hitachi
December 10 – Shūji Terayama, poet, writer, film director, and photographer (d. 1983)
December 19 – Taizo Nishimuro, businessman (d. 2017)
date unknown - Keizaburo Tejima, artist and author

Deaths
January 17 – Ishikawa Chiyomatsu, biologist, zoologist, and ichthyologist (b. 1861)
February 28 – Tsubouchi Shōyō, author, critic and educator (b. 1859)
March 8 – Hachikō, a faithful Akita, on the spot where he had awaited his dead owner for nine years 
March 20 – Gyoshū Hayami, painter (b. 1894)
August 12 – Tetsuzan Nagata, general (b. 1884)

See also
 List of Japanese films of the 1930s

References

 
1930s in Japan
Years of the 20th century in Japan